Thamnistes is a genus of antbirds. It includes the following species:

 Thamnistes anabatinus, russet antshrike, the sole species in the genus until 2018
 Thamnistes rufescens, rufescent antshrike, elevated from subspecies to species in 2018

References

 
Bird genera
Taxa named by Philip Sclater
Taxa named by Osbert Salvin